Pope is a village in the municipality of Tutin, Serbia. According to the 2002 census, the village has a population of 79 people.

Pope is one of the ethnic Serb villages of Tutin.

References

Populated places in Raška District